Nikita Aleksandrovich Andreyev (born 2 November 1997) is a Russian football player. He plays in Armenia for Van.

Club career

He made his professional debut for FC Zenit Saint Petersburg in the Russian Cup game against FC Tosno on 28 October 2015.

On 5 September 2016, he joined FC VSS Košice on loan.

On 22 February 2018, he signed a 3-year contract with FC Anzhi Makhachkala. He made his Russian Premier League debut for Anzhi on 10 March 2019 in a game against FC Lokomotiv Moscow.

References

External links
 

1997 births
Living people
People from Lakhdenpokhsky District
Russian footballers
Association football midfielders
FC Zenit Saint Petersburg players
FC VSS Košice players
FC Anzhi Makhachkala players
FC Van players
Russian Premier League players
2. Liga (Slovakia) players
Armenian First League players
Russian expatriate footballers
Russian expatriate sportspeople in Slovakia
Russian expatriate sportspeople in Armenia
Expatriate footballers in Slovakia
Expatriate footballers in Armenia
FC Zenit-2 Saint Petersburg players
Sportspeople from the Republic of Karelia